Statistics of Latvian Higher League in the 1981 season.

Overview
It was contested by 16 teams, and Elektrons won the championship.

League standings

References
 RSSSF

Latvian SSR Higher League
Football 
Latvia